Nuba most commonly refers to the Nuba peoples.

It may also refer to:

Nuba Mountains, the homeland of the Nuba
Nuba languages, the languages of the Nuba Mountains
Nuba fighting, a combat sport of the Nuba
Nuba, Hebron, a Palestinian village
Andalusi nubah, a North African musical form
Nuubaat, an Algerian musical form
Nüba, a deity in Chinese mythology
Nuba (album), an American jazz album